This is a list of those who have served as President of the Socialist Republic of Vietnam from the establishment of the position to the present. Since Vietnam is a single-party state, the president is generally considered to hold the second highest position in the political system, after the General Secretary of the Communist Party of Vietnam. In its current incarnation the president is the head of state of the Socialist Republic of Vietnam, as well as the head of government in tandem with prime minister. The president represents Vietnam internally and externally, supervises the work as well as preserving the stability of the national governmental system and safeguards the independence and territorial integrity of the country. The president appoints prime minister, vice-presidents, ministers and other officials with the consent of the National Assembly. The head of state is the de jure commander-in-chief of the Vietnam People's Armed Forces and Chairman of the Council for Defence and Security, an organ of the National Assembly. Since Vietnam is a one-party state, with the Communist Party of Vietnam being the sole party allowed by the constitution, all the presidents of the Democratic Republic and the Socialist Republic have been members of the party while holding office. The current interim President is Võ Thị Ánh Xuân since the resignation of Nguyễn Xuân Phúc on 18 January 2023.
 
The modern office of the President of the Socialist Republic traces its lineage back to Hồ Chí Minh, the first President of the North  Vietnam, and the office has no connection, or lineage, officially at least, to the head of state of the former South Vietnam (Nguyễn Hữu Thọ, a communist and the head of state of South Vietnam). Officially there have been 11 presidents, although the count is 12 presidents should the one declared president of South Vietnam be counted.

Democratic Republic of Vietnam (North Vietnam, 1945–1976)

Status

Republic of South Vietnam (1969–1976)

Socialist Republic of Vietnam (1976–present)

Status

Timeline

List of presidents by length of tenure

See also
 List of prime ministers of Vietnam
 List of heads of state of Vietnam
 List of spouses of Vietnamese presidents
 Leaders of South Vietnam

Notes

1. These numbers are official. The "—" denotes acting head of state. The first column shows how many presidents there have been in Vietnamese history, while the second show how many presidents there was in that state.

References

Bibliography

  
 

Vietnam
Vietnamese presidents by time in office
Presidents